Labdia ischnotypa is a moth in the family Cosmopterigidae. It was described by Turner in 1923. It is found in Australia, where it has been recorded from Queensland.

Description 
The moth has been described as measuring 8mm. The head is a white-grey colour. The body comprises a dark thorax, grey abdomen, with narrow forewings. The palpi, antennae and legs are white.

References

Natural History Museum Lepidoptera generic names catalog

Labdia
Moths described in 1923